The Victoria Cross (VC) was awarded to 153 members of the British Indian Army and civilians under its command, from 1857 until independence in 1947. The Victoria Cross is a military decoration awarded for valour "in the face of the enemy" to members of armed forces of some Commonwealth countries and previous British Empire territories. It takes precedence over all other Orders, decorations and medals. It may be awarded to a person of any rank in any service and to civilians under military command. The VC is traditionally presented to the recipient by the British monarch during an investiture at Buckingham Palace, though in a large number of cases this was not possible and it was presented in the field by a prominent civil or military official. The VC was introduced in Great Britain on 29 January 1856 by Queen Victoria to reward acts of valour during the Crimean War.

Indian troops were not originally eligible for the VC, because since 1837 they had been eligible for the Indian Order of Merit—the oldest British gallantry award for general issue. When the VC was created, Indian troops were still controlled by the British East India Company, and did not come under Crown control until 1860. European officers and men serving with the East India Company were not eligible for the Indian Order of Merit; the VC was extended to cover them in October 1857. It was only at the end of the 19th century that calls for Indian troops to be awarded the VC intensified. Indian troops became eligible for the award in 1911. The first awards to Indian troops appeared in The London Gazette on 7 December 1914 to Darwan Singh Negi and Khudadad Khan. Negi was presented with the VC by King George V two days earlier, on 5 December 1914, during a visit to troops in France. He is one of a small number of soldiers presented with his award before it appeared in the London Gazette.

There have been a total of 148 VC recipients who were serving with an Indian Army or Honourable East India Company (HEIC) unit. 63 VCs were awarded to British officers and men of the HEIC during the Anglo-Persian War (1856–1857) and the Indian Rebellion of 1857. 33 VCs were awarded for action in various campaigns between the rebellion in 1857 and the First World War. 18 VCs were awarded for action in the First World War, and 30 in the Second World War. In addition to these, 5 civilians under military command were awarded the VC.

Recipients

References

Specific

General
 
 
 
 
 
 

British Indian Army personnel
Indian Army
 
India and the Commonwealth of Nations